North Bohemia is a region in the north of the Czech Republic.

Location
North Bohemia roughly covers the present-day NUTS regional unit of CZ04 Severozápad and the western part of CZ05 Severovýchod. 
From an administrative perspective, North Bohemia is made up of the present day Ústí nad Labem Region, Karlovy Vary Region and Liberec Region.

In German language usage the term Nordböhmen (North Bohemia) often refers to that part of the Sudetenland once mainly populated by Germans in North Bohemia between Karlovy Vary in the west and the Krkonoše in the east.

Geography and nature
North Bohemia is divided into many landscape areas including the Ore Mountains, the Bohemian Switzerland national park,  Mácha’s Country, the Lusatian Mountains and Ještěd Ridge, Frýdlantsko and the Jizera Mountains. It is a popular tourist destination, much of which had been inaccessible until recently.

The Jizera and Lusatian Mountains are protected landscape areas. The summits of the Jizera Mountains climb to heights of about 1,000 metres above sea level, and the region’s peat bogs have been opened up with interconnecting educational trails. The national nature reserve of the Jizera Mountain Beechwood Forest (Jizerskohorské bučiny) contains the largest beech woodland in the Czech Republic, covering .

Major cities and towns in North Bohemia include Česká Lípa, Děčín, Jablonec nad Nisou, Liberec, Litoměřice, Most and Teplice.

Historic administrative unit 
In the administrative system of the former Czechoslovakia there was a North Bohemia province (Severočeský kraj) from 1960 to 1990 that consisted of the present-day Ústí nad Labem Region and parts of Liberec Region.

See also

 Bohemia
 Central Bohemian Uplands
 North Bohemian Basin

References 

Regions of the Czech Republic
Bohemia